Ma. Sugar Mercado (born September 13, 1986) is a Filipino dancer and actress. She was originally a member of the Sexbomb Girls and one of the hosts of the popular GMA Network noontime variety show Eat Bulaga!. She was dropped by the show in 2007. She is a former co-host of a defunct variety game program Wowowin.

Biography
Mercado is the youngest of four siblings who along with her family lived in Cavite. They lived in a temporary house on top of a hog shed which was built in a tract of land owned by her grandfather. Sugar recounted that during her childhood, her family would sleep on strips of wood and that the roof over their heads would be constantly blown away during a typhoon. But things would eventually look up for her.

During her junior year in high school, she toured with the Gen. Mariano Alvarez Technical High School Band as a majorette. Later, she would join television beauty contests particularly Eat Bulaga!'s "TV Babe" segment in 2001. Sugar lost. Nevertheless, she was signed on to join the SexBomb Girls, an association that lasted less than a year. Sugar decided to finish her studies and three years later, she served a six-month stint with the ABS-CBN noontime variety show MTB: Ang Saya Saya 2002 edition. Six months later, Sugar rejoined the SexBomb Girls and Eat Bulaga!.

It was during the segment Laban o Bawi that she figured in a freak mishap causing her to fall down and accidentally destroy the stage props inside the studio. Mercado's rising popularity reportedly caused a rift between the Eat Bulaga! management and the SexBomb Girls and amid much controversy, the two parted ways. She remained and is now one of the very popular members of the show. After Eat Bulaga was renewed for a new format, she did not come back as host of the show. She has now earned enough money to build a two-story house for her family in Cavite. She left Eat Bulaga! again, though, after some time.

Besides her regular appearances in the GMA Network sitcom Ful Haus, Mercado also performs at the Klownz and Zirkoh bars owned by fellow Eat Bulaga! member Allan K.

Mercado attended Trinity University of Asia School in Quezon City, a middle competency university with fellow actors Ahron Villena, Megan Young, Alfred Navarro,  Che Tolentino, Charles Christianson, Kontin Roque, Sophia Montecarlo, Erich Gonzales, Alvin Aragon, Eslove Briones, Shey Bustamante, Joe Vargas and Marco Aytona. She has been formerly seen on her first dramatic performance and also her first GMA Telebabad, Zorro.

On May 29, 2010, Mercado appeared on Eat Bulaga as a celebrity contestant of Pinoy Henyo.

In 2010, Mercado has no contract with GMA, Sugar transferred to TV5 via My Darling Aswang was her first show on TV5, with her former Ful Haus co-star Vic Sotto and Jose Manalo, and her recent show, Midnight DJ.

In 2011, Mercado was part of Willing Willie (now changed to Wil Time Bigtime) with former Wowowee host Willie Revillame.

In 2014, Mercado is in-active in showbiz until now following her no offer from TV5 in 2012.

In 2015, Mercado is still in-active in showbiz but recently in 2017, she eventually returns to showbiz via Hay, Bahay! and also returned and reunited to fellow host Willie Revillame in Wowowin after 5 years of hiatus in showbiz.

In 2020, Mercado still guestings in a various GMA Network shows such as The Boobay and Tekla Show and Mars Pa More.

Filmography

Television
Jose & Marias Bongga Villa (GMA 7, 2022)
Regal Studio Presents (GMA 7, 2021)
Mars Pa More (GMA 7, 2020)
All-Out Sundays (GMA 7, 2020)
The Boobay and Tekla Show (GMA 7, 2019)
Daig Kayo Ng Lola Ko (GMA 7, 2019)
Studio 7 (GMA 7, 2018)
Stories for the Soul (GMA 7, 2018)
Tadhana (GMA 7, 2018)
Daddy's Gurl (GMA 7, 2018)
Sarap Diva (GMA 7, 2017)
Bubble Gang (GMA 7, 2017)
Hay, Bahay! (GMA 7, 2017)
Wowowin (GMA 7, 2017)
Dear Uge (GMA 7, 2016)
Sunday PinaSaya (GMA 7, 2016)
Dangwa (GMA 7, 2015)
Vampire Ang Daddy Ko (GMA 7, 2015) 
Ismol Family (GMA 7, 2015)
Karelasyon (GMA 7, 2015)
Sabado Badoo (GMA 7, 2015) - Cameo guest footage
TSAS (The Sunday Afternoon Show) (PTV-4, 2015) - Herself / Guest performer
iBilib (GMA 7, 2014)
Wattpadd Presents (TV5, 2014)
Mac & Chiz (TV5, 2014)
Magpakailanman (GMA 7, 2014)
Maalaala Mo Kaya (ABS-CBN 2, 2013)
Sunday All Stars (GMA 7, 2013)
Tropang Kulit (TV5, 2013)
Wil Time Bigtime (2011-2012) - co-host
Midnight DJ:Itim na Belo (2010)
My Darling Aswang (GMA 7, 2010) as Sugar
Party Pilipinas (GMA 7, 2010)
Zorro as Anna
Lipgloss (TV5)
Fulhaus as (2007) Toni
Makita Ka Lang Muli as Andeng
Bahay Mo Ba 'To? episode: "The Bahay Mo Ba 'To Musical"
Takeshi's Castle as Sadako Paroon
Unang Hirit as herself
Lagot Ka, Isusumbong Kita as Sugar
Mobile Kusina as herself
Gandang Ricky Reyes as herself
H3O: Ha Ha Ha Over
Daddy Di Do Du as Sugar
Let's Get Aww as herself
Maynila (GMA 7, 2005)
Daisy Siete as Sugar
Eat Bulaga! as herself (dancer & host)
MTB: Ang Saya Saya (ABS-CBN 2, 2003) as herself (dancer)

Movies
Barbi D Wonder Beki (2017)
I Love You To Death (2016)
Dobol Trobol: Let's Get Ready To Rambol (2008)
Enteng Kabisote 3  (2006)
Oh, My Ghost! (2006)
Ispiritista: Itay, May Moomoo (2005)

References

External links

1986 births
Living people
TV5 (Philippine TV network) personalities
GMA Network personalities
Filipino dance musicians
Filipino television actresses
Filipino women comedians
Actresses from Cavite
Filipino female dancers
Filipino film actresses
SexBomb Girls members